Multivesicular Release (MVR) is the phenomenon by which individual chemical synapses, forming the junction between neurons, is mediated by multiple releasable vesicles of neurotransmitter. In neuroscience, whether one or many vesicles are released per action potential depends on the synapse and has been shown to be more prevalent in humans.

Examples

In the mammalian brain, MVR has been shown to be common throughout the brain including in hippocampus and cerebellum. It has also been proposed and then refuted at the ribbon synapses formed between inner hair cell and spiral ganglion neurons. Recent evidence points to a possibility of MVR at neocortical connections of the somatosensory cortex as well as in other brain regions (for a review see).

References 

Neuroscience
Cell signaling
Signal transduction